Verkhny Kuranakh is a rural locality (a selo), one of three settlements, in addition to the Urban-type settlement of Nizhny Kuranakh, the administrative centre of the settlement, and Yakokit in the settlement of Nizhny Kuranakh of Aldansky District in the Sakha Republic, Russia. Its population as of the 2010 Census was 577; down from 658 recorded in the 2002 Census.

References

Notes

Sources
Official website of the Sakha Republic. Registry of the Administrative-Territorial Divisions of the Sakha Republic. Aldansky District. 

Rural localities in Aldansky District